The Danube Flotilla can refer to any of the following;

 Danube Flotilla (Austria-Hungary)
 Danube Flotilla (Czechoslovakia)
 Danube Flotilla (Hungary)
 Danube Flotilla (Romania)
 Danube Flotilla (Royal Navy)
 Danube Flotilla (Serbia)
 Danube Flotilla (Soviet Union)
 Danube Flotilla (Yugoslavia)